Mount Fiske is a 13,503-foot-elevation (4,116 meter) mountain summit located near the crest of the Sierra Nevada mountain range, in Fresno County of northern California, United States. Mount Fiske ranks as the 60th highest summit in California.

Climate
According to the Köppen climate classification system, Mount Fiske is located in an alpine climate zone. Most weather fronts originate in the Pacific Ocean, and travel east toward the Sierra Nevada mountains. As fronts approach, they are forced upward by the peaks, causing them to drop their moisture in the form of rain or snowfall onto the range (orographic lift). This climate supports the Mount Fiske Glacier in the north cirque. Precipitation runoff from this mountain drains southeast into headwaters of the Middle Fork Kings River, or northwest into Evolution Creek which is a San Joaquin River tributary.

History

In 1895, Sierra Club explorer Theodore S. Solomons named a group of mountains in the Sierra Nevada after exponents of Darwin's theory of evolution. These six peaks are now known collectively as the Evolution Group. This mountain's name commemorates John Fiske (1842–1901), an American philosopher and historian. The other five peaks were named after Charles Darwin, Ernst Haeckel, Alfred Russel Wallace, Herbert Spencer, and Thomas Henry Huxley.

The first ascent of the summit was made August 10, 1922, by Sierra Club member Charles Norman Fiske, his sons John Norman Fiske and Stephen Burlingame Fiske, and Sierra Club member Frederick Kellett via the southeast ridge. The first ascent via the  Southwest Ridge was made on August 18, 1939, by Jack Sturgeon, also of the Sierra Club.

Gallery

See also
 List of the major 4000-meter summits of California
 Mount Haeckel
 Mount Wallace

References

External links

 Weather forecast: Mount Fiske
 Summit panorama video: YouTube
 Account of the first ascent: Sierra Club Bulletin

Mountains of Fresno County, California
Mountains of Kings Canyon National Park
North American 4000 m summits
Mountains of Northern California
Sierra Nevada (United States)